Below are select minor league players and the rosters of the minor league affiliates of the Texas Rangers:

Players

Dane Acker

Dane Harrison Acker (born April 1, 1999) is an American professional baseball pitcher in the Texas Rangers organization.

Acker attended Brenham High School in Brenham, Texas. Acker pitched to a 5–2 record with a 1.79 ERA his senior season of 2017. Undrafted out of high school, he attended Rice University to play for the Owls. Acker went 5–2 with a 4.20 ERA and 32 strikeouts over   innings his freshman season. Following that year, he transferred to San Jacinto College. As a sophomore with San Jac in 2019, Acker went 10–0 with a 2.36 ERA and 97 strikeouts over  innings. Acker was drafted by the Arizona Diamondbacks in the 23rd round of the 2019 MLB draft, but did not sign and transferred to the University of Oklahoma to play for the Sooners. Acker played for the Chatham Anglers of the Cape Cod Baseball League in the summer of 2019. In the COVID shortened season of 2020, Acker went 1–1 with a 3.51 ERA and 28 strikeouts over  innings for OU. In a game on March 1, Acker threw a no-hitter versus LSU, in which he recorded 11 strikeouts. Acker was drafted by the Oakland Athletics in the 4th round of the 2020 MLB draft. He signed with them for a $447,400 signing bonus.

Acker did not play professionally in 2020 due to the cancellation of the Minor League Baseball season because of the COVID-19 pandemic. On February 6, 2021, Acker, Khris Davis, and Jonah Heim were traded to Texas Rangers in exchange for Elvis Andrus, Aramis Garcia and cash considerations.

Acker made two starts for the Down East Wood Ducks of the Low-A East in 2021 before suffering a torn UCL and underwent Tommy John surgery in May 2021. After successfully rehabbing, Acker returned to game action in July 2022. He split the remainder of 2022 between the ACL Rangers of the Rookie-level Arizona Complex League and the Hickory Crawdads of the High-A South Atlantic League, going a combined 0–3 with a 6.31 ERA and 31 strikeouts over  innings.

Oklahoma Sooners bio

Luisangel Acuña

Luisangel José Acuña (born March 12, 2002) is an American professional baseball infielder in the Texas Rangers organization.

Acuña grew up in La Sabana, Venezuela. Acuña had agreed in principle to sign with the Atlanta Braves in 2017, but due to the Braves international signing scandal, Atlanta was stripped of its ability to pay his signing bonus and he returned to the open market. On July 2, 2018, Acuña signed with the Texas Rangers for a $425,000 signing bonus.

Acuña made his professional debut with the DSL Rangers of the Rookie-level Dominican Summer League in 2019, hitting .342/.438/.455/.893 with 2 home runs, 29 RBI, and 17 stolen bases, and was named to the DSL All-Star team. He did not play in 2020 due to the cancellation of the Minor League Baseball season because of the COVID-19 pandemic. Acuña spent the 2021 season with the Down East Wood Ducks of the Low-A East. Over 111 games he hit .266/.345/.404/.749 with 12 home runs, 74 RBI, and 44 stolen bases. Acuña was named the Rangers 2021 minor league Defender of the Year. Acuña opened the 2022 season with the Hickory Crawdads of the High-A South Atlantic League, hitting .317/.417/.483/.900 with 8 home runs, 29 RBI, and 28 stolen bases over 54 games. He was promoted to the Frisco RoughRiders of the Double-A Texas League on August 2 and finished the season after hitting .224/.302/.349/.651 with 3 home runs, 18 RBI, and 13 stolen bases for Frisco. Acuña played for the Surprise Saguaros of the Arizona Fall League following the 2022 season, and was named to the Fall League All-Star team.

On November 15, 2022, Acuña was added to the Rangers’ 40-man roster. Acuña was optioned to Double-A Frisco to begin the 2023 season.

Luisangel comes from a baseball family. His half-brother, Ronald Acuña Jr. is an MLB outfielder. His father Ronald Sr. played in minor league baseball for three organizations, and his younger brother Bryan currently plays in the Minnesota Twins organization.

Grant Anderson

Grant Anderson (born June 21, 1997) is an American professional baseball pitcher in the Texas Rangers organization.

Anderson attended West Orange-Stark High School in West Orange, Texas. Undrafted out of high school, he attended McNeese State University to play college baseball for the Cowboys. After posting a 13.80 ERA as a freshman, Anderson went 8–0 with a 2.30 ERA and 56 strikeouts over  innings as a sophomore. As a junior, Anderson pitched to a 4–7 record with a 3.86 ERA and 72 strikeouts over  innings. Anderson was drafted Seattle Mariners in the 21st round of the 2018 MLB draft.

Anderson split his professional debut season of 2018 between the AZL Mariners, Everett AquaSox, and the Clinton LumberKings, going a combined 2–1 with a 1.38 ERA and 13 strikeouts over 13 innings.

On April 1, 2019, Anderson was traded to the Texas Rangers in exchange for Connor Sadzeck. He spent the 2019 season with the Hickory Crawdads of the Class A South Atlantic League, going 7–4 with a 3.22 ERA and 50 strikeouts over  innings. He did not play in 2020 due to the cancellation of the Minor League Baseball season because of the COVID-19 pandemic. Anderson split the 2021 season between Hickory (reclassified to the High-A East) and the Frisco RoughRiders of the Double-A Central, going a combined 2–4 with a 5.76 ERA and 61 strikeouts over  innings. His 2022 campaign was split between Frisco and the Round Rock Express of the Triple-A Pacific Coast League, with whom he posted a 5–0 combined record with a 3.48 ERA and 91 strikeouts over  innings. During the 2022 offseason, he played in the Puerto Rican Winter League for the Cangrejeros de Santurce, posting a 1–2 record with a 0.47 ERA and 24 strikeouts over 19 innings.

McNeese Cowboys bio

Cody Bradford

Cody Bradford (born February 22, 1998) is an American professional baseball pitcher in the Texas Rangers organization.

Bradford attended Aledo High School in Aledo, Texas. He produced a 0.64 ERA with 87 strikeouts over 66 innings during his senior season; A year in which he was also valedictorian of his high school class. Undrafted out of high school, Bradford attended Baylor University to play college baseball for the Bears. Bradford appeared in 15 games for Baylor in his freshman season of 2017; posting a 5–5 record with a 5.52 ERA and 43 strikeouts over  innings. He posted a 7–6 record with a 2.51 ERA and 87 strikeouts over  innings in his sophomore season of 2018. Bradford appeared in two games for the Chatham Anglers of the Cape Cod League in 2018, posting a 2.25 ERA over 8 innings. Bradford was named to the 2018 USA Baseball Collegiate National Team; posting a 1–0 record with a 0.00 ERA and 5 strikeouts over 5 innings. Bradford with named the 2018 Big 12 Conference Baseball Pitcher of the Year. Bradford appeared in 3 games for Baylor in 2019, before being shut down due to injury. He underwent surgery for Thoracic outlet syndrome on March 27 and missed the rest of the 2019 season.

Bradford was drafted by the Texas Rangers in the 6th round of the 2019 MLB draft. He signed with Texas for a $700,000 signing bonus, which was $418,000 over slot value. He did not play in 2020 due to the cancellation of the Minor League Baseball season because of the COVID-19 pandemic. Bradford was assigned to the Hickory Crawdads of the High-A East to open the 2021 season. With them, he posted a 4–4 record with a 4.23 ERA and 87 strikeouts over  innings. He was promoted to the Frisco RoughRiders of the Double-A Central in August. In 7 games for Frisco, he went 2–0 with a 3.89 ERA and 41 strikeouts over  innings. Bradford returned to Frisco for the 2022 season, going 10–7 with a 5.01 ERA and 124 strikeouts over  innings.

Bradford received a non-roster invitation to major league spring training in 2023.

Bradford graduated from Baylor University in 2019 with a degree in supply chain management. He married his wife, Madi, in December 2019.

Mitch Bratt

Mitchell Eric Bratt (born July 3, 2003) is a Canadian professional baseball pitcher in the Texas Rangers organization.

Bratt grew up in Newmarket, Ontario and attended Newmarket High School. After most Canadian baseball leagues were shut down due to Covid-19, he pitched for Georgia Premier Academy in Statesboro, Georgia while completing his final year of high school online. Bratt played summer collegiate baseball after his senior year for the West Virginia Black Bears of the MLB Draft League and had a 2.57 ERA and 44 strikeouts in 28 innings pitched.

Bratt was selected by the Texas Rangers in the fifth round of the 2021 Major League Baseball Draft. After signing with the team he was assigned to ACL Rangers of the Rookie-level Arizona Complex League, where he did not allow an earned run and struck out 13 batters in six innings pitched. Bratt spent the 2022 season with the Down East Wood Ducks of the Low-A Carolina League, going 5–5 with a 2.45 ERA and 99 strikeouts over  innings. Bratt was the recipient of the 2022 Wayne Norton Award, as the top Canadian MiLB player for that season.

Evan Carter

Evan Jason Carter (born August 29, 2002) is an American professional baseball outfielder in the Texas Rangers organization.

Carter was born and grew up in Elizabethton, Tennessee and attended Elizabethton High School. He was an All-Conference selection in baseball in all three seasons he played. He committed to play college baseball at Duke after his sophomore year. As a junior, Carter batted .324 with four homers and 27 RBIs and was 10–2 with a 1.34 ERA and six complete games as a pitcher.

Carter was selected in the 2nd round of the 2020 MLB Draft by the Texas Rangers and received a $1.25 million signing bonus. His selection at 50th overall came under scrutiny due to the fact that MLB.com had not considered him a top-200 prospect and Baseball America had not rated him one of its top 500 prospects. Carter spent the 2021 season with the Down East Wood Ducks of the Low-A East, hitting .236/.438/.387/.825 with 2 home runs, 12 RBI, and 12 stolen bases over 32 games. In June 2021, Carter suffered a stress fracture in his lower back, which caused him to miss the remainder of that season. Carter split the 2022 season between the Hickory Crawdads of the High-A South Atlantic League and the Frisco RoughRiders of the Double-A Texas League, hitting a combined .295/.397/.489/.885 with 12 home runs, 73 RBI, and 28 stolen bases.

Carter was named the Texas Rangers 2022 Tom Grieve Player of the Year. He also received a 2022 minor league Rawlings Gold Glove Award. Carter was ranked as the 26th overall prospect in baseball by Baseball America, the 41st overall prospect by MLB Pipeline, and the 53rd overall prospect by The Athletic's Keith Law during the 2023 off-season.

Carter received a non-roster invitation to major league spring training in 2023.

Marc Church

Marc Easton Church (born March 30, 2001) is an American professional baseball pitcher in the Texas Rangers organization.

Church attended North Atlanta High School in Atlanta, Georgia. He spent most of his life as an infielder, committing to North Carolina A&T State University as such after his junior season. Church converted to pitching and reached 93 MPH on his fastball as a senior. He was drafted by the Texas Rangers in the 18th round of the 2019 MLB draft. Church signed with Texas for an over-slot $300,000 signing bonus.

After signing, Church did not appear in an official game with a Rangers' affiliate in the 2018 season. Instead, he took part in a new program put in place by Texas for their newly drafted high school pitchers. The "de-load" program as the organization called it, emphasized building a foundation mentally and physically while resting the pitchers' bodies from a strenuous senior season and pre-draft showcase circuit. The players were put through a strength program and classroom work until the post-season fall instructional training started. He did not play in 2020 due to the cancellation of the Minor League Baseball season because of the COVID-19 pandemic. Church made his professional debut and spent the 2021 season with the Down East Wood Ducks of the Low-A East, going 3–1 with a 4.28 ERA and 49 strikeouts over  innings. He missed the second half of that season with elbow inflammation that did not require surgery. Church opened the 2022 season with the Hickory Crawdads of the High-A South Atlantic League, going 2–2 with a 2.91 ERA and 57 strikeouts over 34 innings. He was promoted to the Frisco RoughRiders of the Double-A Texas League on June 29, and struggled to a 1–3 record with a 7.20 ERA and 21 strikeouts over 15 innings.

Church received a non-roster invitation to major league spring training in 2023.

Blaine Crim

Linton Blaine Crim (born June 17, 1997) is an American professional baseball first baseman in the Texas Rangers organization.

Crim attended St. Paul's Episcopal School in Mobile, Alabama. As a senior Crim went 12–0 on the mound with a 1.88 ERA and 69 strikeouts, while hitting .536 with eight home runs and 61 RBIs to earn Alabama Coastal Player of the Year and 2nd team 2014-15 ALL-USA Alabama Baseball Team. Undrafted out of high school, Crim attended Mississippi College where he played college baseball for the Mississippi College Choctaws. Crim hit .300/.358/.424/.781 with 3 home runs and 33 RBI and went 3–4 with a 7.18 ERA over  innings on the mound as a freshman in 2016. He hit .335/.392/.540/.933 with 8 home runs and 41 RBI in 2017. During the summer of 2017, he played for the Southern Ohio Copperheads of the Great Lakes Summer Collegiate League and hit .359/.389/.557/.946 with 4 home runs and 38 RBI and being named the MVP of GLSCL All-Star game. Crim produced a .383/.435/.665/1.100 batting line with 13 home runs and 66 RBI as a junior in 2018. That summer he returned to play for Southern Ohio; hitting .404/.419/.680/1.099 with 7 home runs and 52 RBI. Crim returned for his senior season in 2019 and hit .373/.423/.689/1.112 with 11 home runs and 56 RBI. Crim was drafted by the Texas Rangers in the 19th round of the 2019 MLB draft and signed with them.

Crim split his professional debut season of 2019 between the AZL Rangers of the Rookie-level Arizona League and the Spokane Indians of the Class A Short Season Northwest League, hitting a combined .348/.411/.543/.954 with 8 home runs and 48 RBI. He was named the 2019 Northwest League MVP. Crim did not play in 2020 due to the cancellation of the Minor League Baseball season because of the COVID-19 pandemic. Crim opened the 2021 season with the Hickory Crawdads of the High-A East, hitting .300/.372/.559/.931 with 20 home runs and 61 RBI over 73 games and was named to the 2021 High-A East All-Star team. Then promoted to the Frisco RoughRiders of the Double-A Central, he finished the season hitting .288/.331/.525/.856 with 9 home runs and 19 RBI over 35 games. He played for the Indios de Mayagüez of the Puerto Rican Winter League following the 2021 season. Crim was the league batting champion after hitting .406/.452/.594/1.046 with 3 home runs and 25 RBI. Crim split the 2022 season between Frisco and the Round Rock Express of the Triple-A Pacific Coast League, hitting a combined .293/.357/.485/.843 with 24 home runs and 96 RBI.

Crim received a non-roster invitation to major league spring training in 2023.

Scott Engler

Scott Engler (born December 12, 1996) is an American professional baseball pitcher in the Texas Rangers organization.

Engler attended Bishop Carroll Catholic High School in Wichita, Kansas. Undrafted out of high school, he attended Cowley Community College in Arkansas City, Kansas. Engler was drafted by the Texas Rangers in the 16th round of the 2016 MLB draft.

Engler made his professional debut in 2016, appearing in four games for the AZL Rangers of the Rookie-level Arizona League. Engler suffered a torn UCL which required Tommy John surgery and caused him to miss the 2017 season. Engler played for the Spokane Indians of the Class A Short Season Northwest League in 2018, going 3–6 with a 5.87 ERA and 49 strikeouts over  innings. Engler split to the 2019 season between the Hickory Crawdads of the Class A South Atlantic League and the Down East Wood Ducks of the Class A-Advanced Carolina League, going a combined 5–2 with a 2.23 ERA and 103 strikeouts over  innings. He did not play in 2020 due to the cancellation of the Minor League Baseball season because of the COVID-19 pandemic. Engler opened the 2021 season with the Frisco RoughRiders of the Double-A Central, going 1–0 with a 3.20 ERA and 32 strikeouts over  innings. He was promoted to the Round Rock Express of the Triple-A West on June 16, and posted a 2–0 record with a 4.01 ERA and 32 strikeouts over  innings.

On February 28, 2022, Engler underwent Tommy John surgery to repair a second torn UCL, and missed the 2022 season.

Crowley College Tigers bio

David García

David Alejandro García (born February 6, 2000) is a Venezuelan professional baseball catcher in the Texas Rangers organization.

García signed with the Texas Rangers as an international free agent in 2016 for a $800,000 signing bonus. He made his professional debut in 2017 with the DSL Rangers of the Rookie-level Dominican Summer League, hitting .215/.321/.280/.601 with 1 home run and 26 RBI. He spent the 2018 season with the AZL Rangers of the Rookie-level Arizona League, hitting .269/.320/.361/.682 with 1 home run and 20 RBI. He played for the Spokane Indians of the Class A Short Season Northwest League in 2019, hitting .277/.351/.435/.786 with 5 home runs and 29 RBI. García did not play in 2020 due to the cancellation of the Minor League Baseball season because of the COVID-19 pandemic.

The Rangers added García to their 40-man roster following the 2020 season. He spent the 2021 season with the Hickory Crawdads of the High-A East, hitting .256/.298/.349/.647 with 5 home runs and 40 RBI. On November 30, 2021, Garcìa was non-tendered by Texas and became a free agent. He re-signed with Texas the next day on a minor league contract with an invitation to major league spring training. García spent the 2022 season with the Frisco RoughRiders of the Double-A Texas League, hitting a paltry .228/.295/.346/.641 with 5 home runs and 36 RBI. He became a free agent following the 2022 season, but re-signed with Texas on December 7, 2022. He received a non-roster invitation to major league spring training in 2023.

Ryan Garcia

Ryan Miguel Garcia (born January 24, 1998) is an American professional baseball pitcher in the Texas Rangers organization.

Garcia attended La Salle High School in Pasadena, California. As a senior in 2016, Garcia posted a 1.16 ERA with 48 strikeouts over  innings. Undrafted out of high school, he attended the University of California, Los Angeles where he played college baseball for the UCLA Bruins. As a freshman in 2017, he posted a 2–0 record with a 6.57 ERA over  innings. That summer he played for the Waterloo Bucks in the Northwoods League, going 3–2 with a 1.88 ERA with 52 strikeouts over 48 innings. As a sophomore in 2018, Garcia excelled to an 8–1 record with a 2.23 ERA and 76 strikeouts over  innings. He followed up that summer by playing in the Cape Cod League for the Wareham Gatemen, where he went 2–0 with a 1.29 ERA with 33 strikeouts over 28 innings. Garcia's best season came as a junior in 2019. He posted a 10–1 record with a 1.44 ERA and 117 strikeouts over 94 innings. He was named the 2019 Pac-12 Conference Baseball Pitcher of the Year and was named a First Team All-American.

Garcia was drafted by the Texas Rangers in the 2nd round of the 2019 MLB draft. He signed with them for a $1,469,900 signing bonus.

Garcia split his professional debut in 2019 between the AZL Rangers of the Rookie-level Arizona League and the Spokane Indians of the Class A Short Season Northwest League, posting a 3.60 ERA in 5 innings over 3 games. He did not play in 2020 due to the cancellation of the Minor League Baseball season because of the COVID-19 pandemic. Garcia suffered a torn UCL which required Tommy John surgery in March 2020. The surgery and his rehab caused him to miss the 2021 season. Garcia returned to game action in 2022 with the Down East Wood Ducks of the Low-A Carolina League and the Hickory Crawdads of the High-A South Atlantic League, posting a combined 2–2 record with a 1.91 ERA and 74 strikeouts over  innings.

Josh Gessner

Joshua Hugh Gessner (born June 25, 2000) is an Australian professional baseball pitcher in the Texas Rangers organization.

Gessner was born in Sydney, Australia and spent part of his childhood living in Japan until his family moved to Manly, New South Wales. In 2017, he pitched for the Sydney Blue Sox of the Australian Baseball League. Gessner committed to play college baseball at Tulane prior to signing with the Phillies.

Gessner played for the Victoria HarbourCats of the West Coast League in 2019. That summer, he was signed by the Philadelphia Phillies on June 11, 2019, and received an $850,000 signing bonus. Gessner was assigned to the Rookie-level Gulf Coast League Phillies after signing and went 1–0 with a 2.84 ERA and 17 strikeouts over six appearances with the team. He did not play in 2020 due to the cancellation of the Minor League Baseball season because of the COVID-19 pandemic. Gessner was assigned to the Florida Complex League Phillies at the beginning of the 2021 season.

On July 30, 2021, Gessner, along with Spencer Howard and Kevin Gowdy, were traded to the Texas Rangers in exchange for Kyle Gibson, Ian Kennedy, and Hans Crouse. Following the trade, he spent the remainder of that season with the ACL Rangers of the Rookie-level Arizona Complex League; posting a 2–2 record with a 3.95 ERA and 46 strikeouts over  innings.

Dustin Harris

Dustin Alexander Harris (born July 8, 1999) is an American professional baseball first baseman, third baseman, and outfielder in the Texas Rangers organization.

Harris attended Land o' Lakes High School in Land o' Lakes, Florida. He was named First Team All-State during his senior season in 2017. Undrafted out of high school in 2017, Harris attended St. Petersburg College in St. Petersburg, Florida to play college baseball for the Titans. He hit .373 with 33 RBI in 2018. During the summer of 2018, he played for the Worcester Bravehearts of the Futures Collegiate Baseball League. He hit .306/.367/.434/.800 with 2 home runs and 42 RBI, and was named a league All-Star. Harris committed to transfer to Florida Atlantic University following his sophomore season. In his sophomore season of 2019, he hit .409 with 7 home runs, 42 RBI, and 13 stolen bases. He was drafted by the Oakland Athletics in the 11th round of the 2019 MLB draft, and signed with them for a $250,000 signing bonus.

Harris split his professional debut season of 2019 between the Arizona League Athletics and the Vermont Lake Monsters, combining to hit .325/.403/.407/.810 with 1 home run and 26 RBI. He did not play in 2020 due to the cancellation of the Minor League Baseball season due to the COVID-19 pandemic.

On September 18, 2020, Harris and Marcus Smith were traded to the Texas Rangers as the PTBNL's in the Mike Minor trade. Harris opened the 2021 season with the Down East Wood Ducks of the Low-A East, hitting .301/.389/.483/.872 with 10 home runs, 53 RBI, and 20 stolen bases. He was promoted to the Hickory Crawdads of the High-A East on August 3. Harris hit .372/.425/.648/1.073 with 10 home runs, 32 RBI, and 5 stolen bases over 37 games for Hickory. Harris was named the Rangers 2021 Tom Grieve Player of the Year. Harris spent the 2022 season with the Frisco RoughRiders of the Double-A Texas League, hitting .257/.346/.471/.817 with 17 home runs, 66 RBI, and 19 stolen bases over 85 games. He represented the Rangers at the 2022 All-Star Futures Game. Harris missed the final two months of the 2022 season due to a left wrist sprain.

On November 15, 2022, Harris was selected to the Rangers’ 40-man roster. Harris was optioned to the Triple-A Round Rock Express to begin the 2023 season.

Trevor Hauver

Trevor James Hauver (born November 20, 1998) is an American professional baseball outfielder in the Texas Rangers organization.

Hauver attended Perry High School in Gilbert, Arizona, where he played shortstop for the baseball team. The Kansas City Royals selected him in the 37th round of the 2017 MLB draft. Hauver did not sign with the Royals, and attended Arizona State University, where he played college baseball for the Arizona State Sun Devils. In 2018 and 2019, he played collegiate summer baseball with the Hyannis Harbor Hawks of the Cape Cod Baseball League.

The New York Yankees selected Hauver in the third round, with the 99th overall selection, of the 2020 MLB draft. He did not make his professional debut in 2020 due to the cancellation of the Minor League Baseball season due to the COVID-19 pandemic. He began the 2021 season with the Tampa Tarpons of the Low-A Southeast. He hit six home runs over his first five professional games. He was named the Low-A Southeast Player of the Week for the week of May 4 to 9, and Player of the Month for May.

On July 29, 2021, Hauver along with Josh Smith, Glenn Otto, and Ezequiel Durán were traded to the Texas Rangers in exchange for Joey Gallo and Joely Rodríguez. Hauver was assigned to the Hickory Crawdads of the High-A East following the trade, and hit .246/.357/.426/.783 with six home runs and 21 RBIs over 33 games for them. Hauver split the 2022 season between Hickory and the Frisco RoughRiders of the Class AA Texas League, hitting a combined .220/.387/.427/.814 with 17 home runs and 70 RBI. He played for the Surprise Saguaros of the Arizona Fall League following the 2022 season.

Lucas Jacobsen

Lucas Jacobsen (born July 1, 1995) is an American professional baseball pitcher in the Texas Rangers organization.

Jacobsen attended Westmont High School in Campbell, California. He went 7–2 with a 2.54 ERA and 55 strikeouts as a senior in 2013. Undrafted out of high school, he attended Santa Barbara City College. Jacobsen suffered a hairline fracture in his left elbow during the 2013 fall season, and choose to leave the team. He returned to the team for the following season after healing and recommitting to the game. He posted an 8–4 record with a 2.90 ERA and 62 strikeouts over  innings in 2015 for Santa Barbara. Jacobsen transferred to California State University, Long Beach and posted a 0–2 record with a 3.30 ERA and 35 strikeouts over 30 innings for the Dirtbags in 2016. Jacobsen was drafted by the Texas Rangers in the 27th round of the 2016 MLB draft.

Jacobsen made his professional debut in 2016 with the AZL Rangers of the Rookie-level Arizona League, going 1–0 with a 6.75 ERA and 12 strikeouts over  innings. He split the 2017 season between the AZL and the Spokane Indians of the Class A Short Season Northwest League, going a combined 3–0 with a 3.77 ERA and 25 strikeouts over  innings. Jacobsen suffered a torn UCL during the 2017 season and underwent Tommy John surgery which caused him to miss the 2018 season. He returned in 2019 with the Hickory Crawdads of the Class A South Atlantic League, going 1–4 with a 3.90 ERA and 48 strikeouts over 30 innings. Following the 2019 season, he played for the Auckland Tuatara of the Australian Baseball League. He did not play in 2020 due to the cancellation of the Minor League Baseball season because of the COVID-19 pandemic. Jacobsen also missed the entire 2021 season due to a lat muscle injury. He split the 2022 season between the Frisco RoughRiders of the Double-A Texas League and the Round Rock Express of the Triple-A Pacific Coast League, going a combined 0–1 with a 2.29 ERA and 30 strikeouts. Jacobsen logged only  innings that year due to missing nearly 4 months with a  left elbow impingement.

Jacobsen received a non-roster invitation to major league spring training in 2023.

Long Beach State Dirtbags bio

Antoine Kelly

Antoine Jermaine Kelly (born December 5, 1999) is an American professional baseball pitcher in the Texas Rangers organization.

The San Diego Padres drafted Kelly in the 13th round (381 overall) out of Maine East High School in 2018. Kelly elected to attend Wabash Valley College instead. In his lone season at Wabash Valley Kelly started 13 games posting a 9–0 record, with a 1.88 ERA and 112 strikeouts. The Milwaukee Brewers selected Kelly 65th overall (second round) in the 2019 MLB draft.

In his first pro season of 2019, Kelly posted a 2.84 ERA over  innings with the Arizona League Brewers Blue and the Wisconsin Timber Rattlers. Kelly did not play in 2020 due to the cancellation of the Minor League Baseball season because of the COVID-19 pandemic. In November 2020, Kelly underwent thoracic outlet syndrome surgery. Upon completing rehab Kelly split the 2021 season between the AZL Brewers, Wisconsin, and the Carolina Mudcats, going a combined 0–2 with a 9.78 ERA over  innings. He opened the 2022 season with Wisconsin, going 2–4 with a 3.86 ERA and 119 strikeouts over 91 innings. Kelly represented the Brewers at the 2022 All-Star Futures Game.

On August 1, 2022, Kelly and Mark Mathias were traded to the Texas Rangers in exchange for Matt Bush. Kelly finished the season with the Frisco RoughRiders of the Double-A Texas League, posting a 7.23 ERA with 24 strikeouts over  innings.

Kelly received a non-roster invitation to major league spring training in 2023.

Zak Kent

Zachary Allen Kent (born February 24, 1998) is an American professional baseball pitcher in the Texas Rangers organization.

Kent attended Northumberland High School in Heathsville, Virginia. As a sophomore Kent was a member of their 1A State Championship team in 2014; a season in which he hit .315 and posted a 1.96 ERA. Kent was named VHSL 1A All-State as a pitcher in his senior season of 2016. Undrafted out of high school, Kent attended the Virginia Military Institute to play college baseball for the VMI Keydets for three seasons. Kent enjoyed his best season as a junior in 2019, when he went 5–5 with a 4.64 ERA and 132 strikeouts over 97 innings. Kent was drafted by the Texas Rangers in the 9th round, with the 265th overall selection, of the 2019 MLB draft. He signed with Texas for a $140,000 signing bonus.

Kent split his professional debut season of 2019 between the AZL Rangers of the Rookie-level Arizona League and the Spokane Indians of the Class A Short Season Northwest League, going combined 0–1 with a 5.12 ERA and 18 strikeouts over  innings. Kent did not play in 2020 due to the cancellation of the Minor League Baseball season because of the COVID-19 pandemic. He opened the 2021 season with the Hickory Crawdads of the High-A East, going 6–2 with a 2.83 ERA and 78 strikeouts over  innings. After being promoted to the Frisco RoughRiders of the Double-A Central in August, he posted a 0–4 record with a 5.34 ERA and 39 strikeouts over  innings. Kent split the 2022 season between Frisco and the Round Rock Express of the Triple-A Pacific Coast League, going a combined 3–4 with a 3.94 ERA and 110 strikeouts over  innings.

On November 15, 2022, Kent was selected to the Rangers’ 40-man roster. Kent was optioned to Triple-A Round Rock to begin the 2023 season.

VMI Keydets bio

Chase Lee

Chase Alexander Lee (born August 13, 1998) is an American professional baseball pitcher in the Texas Rangers organization.

Lee grew up in McCalla, Alabama and attended McAdory High School. He played mostly shortstop in high school and was used as a pitcher sparingly in one season.

Lee enrolled at the University of Alabama after having received no offers to play college baseball. He tried out for the Alabama Crimson Tide baseball team as a freshman, but was not offered a spot on the team. Lee changed his pitching motion to a sidearm delivery at the recommendation of Alabama head coach Brad Bohannon and joined the Alabama club baseball team, where he posted a 7–0 record and a 0.21 ERA.

Lee made the Crimson Tide as a walk-on the following season and posted a 2.67 ERA in 22 appearances with 24 strikeouts over  innings pitched. After the end of the season he played collegiate summer baseball for the Bethesda Big Train of the Cal Ripken Collegiate Baseball League and was named the league's Pitcher of the Year after leading the league with 51 strikeouts and seven saves with an ERA of 1.03. Lee was named Alabama's closer going into his redshirt sophomore season and had a 1.64 ERA and 19 strikeouts in five appearances before the season was cut short due to the coronavirus pandemic. As a junior, he was named a third team All-American after posting a 7–0 record with a 1.33 ERA and 51 strikeouts in  innings pitched.

Lee was selected by the Texas Rangers in the sixth round of the 2021 Major League Baseball Draft. After signing with the team he was assigned to the Rookie-level Arizona Complex League Rangers, where he made one appearance before being promoted to the Double-A Frisco RoughRiders. He finished the season going 0–1 with a 3.71 ERA and 27 strikeouts over 17 innings for Frisco. Lee returned to Frisco to open the 2022 season, going 1–1 with a 2.25 ERA and 30 strikeouts over 24 innings, before being promoted to the Round Rock Express of the Triple-A Pacific Coast League on June 14. With Round Rock, Lee went 1–1 with a 5.46 ERA and 41 strikeouts over  innings. Lee was named the Texas Rangers 2022 minor league Reliever of the Year.

Lee received a non-roster invitation to major league spring training in 2023.

Alabama Crimson Tide bio

Julio Pablo Martínez

Julio Pablo Martínez Sánchez (born March 21, 1996) is a Cuban professional baseball outfielder in the Texas Rangers organization.

Martínez began his professional career in the Cuban National Series from 2012 through 2017, playing for Guantánamo, Isla de la Juventud, and Camagüey. In 2016, Martínez played for the Cuba national baseball team when they played 20 games in the Can-Am League. He played for the Trois-Rivières Aigles in the Can-Am League in 2017. In November 2017, Martínez defected from Cuba.

Martínez signed with the Texas Rangers as an international free agent in March 2018. He made his professional debut that year with the DSL Rangers of the Rookie-level Dominican Summer League, and was promoted to the Spokane Indians of the Class A Short Season Northwest League after nine games in the DSL in which he batted .409. In 60 games for Spokane he batted .266 with nine home runs, 24 RBIs, and 13 stolen bases. After the 2018 regular season, Martínez played for the Surprise Saguaros of the Arizona Fall League. On October 22, 2018, Martínez hit for the Cycle, going 4–4 with a walk. Martínez was ranked as the #78 overall prospect in baseball by Baseball Prospectus in their preseason 2019 Top 101 list. Martínez was also ranked as the #88 overall prospect in baseball by MLB Pipeline in their preseason 2019 Top 100 list.

Martínez was assigned to the Hickory Crawdads of the Class A South Atlantic League to open the 2019 season. He was promoted to the Down East Wood Ducks of the Class A-Advanced Carolina League on April 17, after hitting .250 with 1 home run and 5 RBI. With Down East, he hit .248/.319/.423/.741 with 14 home runs and 58 RBI over 113 games. Martínez did not play in 2020 due to the cancellation of the Minor League Baseball season because of the COVID-19 pandemic. He spent the 2021 season with the Frisco RoughRiders of the Double-A Central, hitting .242/.355/.368/.724 with 5 home runs and 28 RBI. He split the 2022 season between Frisco and the Round Rock Express of the Triple-A Pacific Coast League, hitting a combined .243/.360/.433/.793 with 15 home runs, 45 RBI, and 39 stolen bases.

Jonathan Ornelas

Jonathan Ornelas (born May 26, 2000) is an American professional baseball infielder in the Texas Rangers organization.

Ornelas attended Raymond S. Kellis High School in Glendale, Arizona. In his senior season of 2018, he hit .464 with 15 doubles, six home runs, 29 RBIs and 19 stolen bases. He had committed to the University of Tennessee to play college baseball. Ornelas was drafted by the Texas Rangers with the 91st overall selection in the 3rd round of the 2018 MLB Draft. He signed with them for a $622,800 signing bonus.

Ornelas was assigned to the AZL Rangers and in 48 games hit .302/.389/.459/.848 with 3 home runs, 28 RBI, and 15 stolen bases over 48 games in his professional debut season of 2018. Ornelas spent the 2019 season with the Hickory Crawdads of the Class A South Atlantic League, hitting .257/.333/.373/.706 with 6 home runs, 13 stolen bases, and 38 RBI. He did not play in 2020 due to the cancellation of the Minor League Baseball season because of the COVID-19 pandemic. Ornelas returned to Hickory (which had moved classification to the High-A East level), hitting .261/.310/.394/.704 with 8 home runs, 9 stolen bases, and 38 RBI. Ornelas spent the 2022 season with the Frisco RoughRiders of the Double-A Texas League. He hit .299/.360/.425/.785 with 14 home runs, 64 RBI, 14 stolen bases, and tied the Frisco franchise record by recording 157 hits in 2022. Ornelas was named the Texas Rangers 2022 minor league Defender of the Year.

On November 15, 2022, Ornelas was selected to the Rangers’ 40-man roster. Ornelas was optioned to the Triple-A Round Rock Express to begin the 2023 season.

Daniel Robert

Daniel McGee Robert (born August 30, 1994) is an American professional baseball pitcher in the Texas Rangers organization.

Robert attended Briarwood Christian School in Birmingham, Alabama. In his sophomore season of 2011, Robert hit .556 with 10 home runs and 48 RBIs and was named the 2011 Birmingham News Metro Baseball Player of the Year. Robert played receiver on the football team in high school. Undrafted out of high school in 2013, Robert attended Auburn University and played college baseball for the Auburn Tigers. At Auburn, Robert played mainly first base and outfield. He enjoyed his best season as a senior in 2017; hitting .290/.402/.429/.830 with 5 home runs and 45 RBI, while recording a 2.16 ERA over 6 appearances on the mound. Robert was drafted by the Texas Rangers in the 21st round of the 2017 MLB draft as a pitcher.

Robert agreed to sign with Texas for a $5,000 signing bonus, but during his physical an MRI revealed a torn UCL. Texas voided his contract and he underwent Tommy John surgery. After rehabbing for six months Robert attended an open tryout with Texas and was signed to a minor league contract in 2018. He spent the remainder of the season in rehabilitation. Robert split his professional debut season of 2019 between the Spokane Indians of the Class A Short Season Northwest League and the Hickory Crawdads of the Class A South Atlantic League, going 2–1 with a 0.99 ERA and 50 strikeouts over  innings. He did not play in 2020 due to the cancellation of the Minor League Baseball season because of the COVID-19 pandemic. Robert split the 2021 season between the ACL Rangers of the Rookie-level Arizona Complex League, Hickory, and the Frisco RoughRiders of the Double-A Central, going a combined 0–1 with a 2.78 ERA and 42 strikeouts over  innings. Robert spent the 2022 season with the Round Rock Express of the Triple-A Pacific Coast League and struggled to a 4–4 record with a 6.28 ERA over  innings. He followed the 2022 season by appearing in eight games for the Surprise Saguaros of the Arizona Fall League.

Robert received a non-roster invitation to major league spring training in 2023.

Auburn Tigers bio

Tekoah Roby

Tekoah Clark Roby (born September 18, 2001) is an American professional baseball pitcher in the Texas Rangers organization.

Roby attended Pine Forest High School in Pensacola, Florida. He had committed to play college baseball for Troy University. He was drafted by the Texas Rangers in the third round of the 2020 Major League Baseball Draft.

He spent his professional debut season of 2021 with the Down East Wood Ducks of the Low-A East, going 2–2 with a 2.45 ERA and 35 strikeouts over 22 innings. Roby missed the majority of that season with a strain of his right elbow but did not require surgery. Roby spent the 2022 season with the Hickory Crawdads of the High-A South Atlantic League, going 3–11 with a 4.64 ERA and 126 strikeouts over  innings.

Thomas Saggese

Thomas Darren Saggese (born April 10, 2002) is an American professional baseball shortstop in the Texas Rangers organization.

Saggese attended Carlsbad High School in Carlsbad, California. As a junior in 2019, he hit .422 with 10 home runs over 102 at-bats. He batted .440 with three home runs over seven games in 2020 before the season was canceled due to the COVID-19 pandemic. He was selected by the Texas Rangers in the fifth round with the 145th overall pick in the 2020 Major League Baseball draft. He signed with the club for $800,000, forgoing his commitment to play college baseball at Pepperdine University.

Saggese made his professional debut in 2021 with the Down East Wood Ducks of the Low-A East, batting .256 with 10 home runs, 37 RBIs, and 11 stolen bases over 73 games. He opened the 2022 season with the Hickory Crawdads of the High-A South Atlantic League, where he was named the Rangers' Minor League Player of the Month for July. He was promoted to the Frisco RoughRiders of the Double-A Texas League for the seasons final week and playoffs. Over 103 games between the two teams, he slashed .312/.361/.506/868 with 15 home runs, 70 RBI, 25 doubles, and 12 stolen bases. Saggese received the Texas Rangers 2022 True Ranger Award, and was named to the South Atlantic League postseason All-Star Team.

Chris Seise

Christopher Seise (born January 6, 1999) is an American professional baseball shortstop in the Texas Rangers organization.

Seise attended West Orange High School in Winter Garden, Florida. He committed to play college baseball at the University of Central Florida. He was drafted by the Texas Rangers in the first round of the 2017 MLB draft.

After signing, he was assigned to the AZL Rangers. There, he posted a .336 batting average with three home runs and 27 RBIs in 27 games which earned him a promotion to the Spokane Indians, where he batted .222 with nine RBIs in 24 games to end his first professional season. He missed all of 2018 after undergoing rotator cuff surgery. Seise was assigned to the Hickory Crawdads of the Class A South Atlantic League to open the 2019 season, and appeared in 21 games, hitting .241/.267/.356/.623 with 6 RBI.  Seise underwent surgery in early May to repair a torn labrum in his left shoulder and missed the rest of the 2019 season. Seise did not play in 2020 due to the cancellation of the Minor League Baseball season because of the COVID-19 pandemic. Seise was assigned to the Hickory Crawdads of the High-A East to open the 2021 season. After just 10 games in 2021, Seise tore the ACL in his right knee, which required season-ending surgery to repair. Seise returned to Hickory for the 2022 season, hitting .246/.319/.384/.703 with 10 home runs, 46 RBI, and 12 stolen bases.

Marcus Smith

Marcus Edward Smith (born September 11, 2000) is an American professional baseball outfielder in the Texas Rangers organization.

Smith attended The Pembroke Hill School in Kansas City, Missouri. Smith committed to play college baseball for the University of Michigan prior to his senior season of high school. He graduated from Pembroke Hill as their all-time leader in hits (112), runs (112), RBI (79), triples (12), and home runs (13). Smith was drafted by the Oakland Athletics in the 3rd round of the 2019 MLB draft and signed with them for a $400,000 signing bonus.

Smith spent his professional debut season of 2019 with the Arizona League Athletics, hitting .361/.466/.443/.909 with 1 home run and 14 RBI over 29 games. He did not play in 2020 due to the cancellation of the Minor League Baseball season due to the COVID-19 pandemic.

On September 18, 2020, Smith and Dustin Harris were traded to the Texas Rangers as the PTBNL's in the Mike Minor trade. Smith suffered through two separate hamstring strains in 2021. Over just 14 games between the Arizona Complex League Rangers and the Down East Wood Ducks, he hit a combined .209/.320/.395/.715 with 1 home run and 8 RBI. Smith returned to Down East to open the 2022 season.

Alex Speas

Alex JoVaughn Speas (born March 4, 1998) is an American professional baseball pitcher in the Texas Rangers organization.

Speas attended McEachern High School in Powder Springs, Georgia. Speas participated in the 2015 Under Armour All-America Baseball Game. He was rated as the 36th ranked prospect entering the 2016 MLB draft by Baseball America. He committed to play college baseball at Auburn University. Speas was drafted by the Texas Rangers in the 2nd round, with the 63rd overall selection, of the 2016 MLB draft. Speas signed with Texas for a $1,024,900 signing bonus.

Speas spent his debut season of 2016 with the AZL Rangers of the Rookie-level Arizona League, recording eight scoreless innings over four appearances. In 2017, Speas played for the Spokane Indians of the Class A Short Season Northwest League, going 1–6 with a 6.15 ERA over  innings in 16 games (7 starts). Speas was transitioned to a full-time relief role in 2018, and went 2–0 with a 2.20 ERA and 49 strikeouts over  innings for the Hickory Crawdads of the Class A South Atlantic League. His season was cut short that June when he underwent Tommy John surgery after suffering a torn ulnar collateral ligament of elbow joint. Speas spent the majority of the 2019 season rehabbing his elbow to full health, making just two appearances for the AZL Rangers. Once returned to full health in 2019, Speas was clocked throwing as hard as 102 mph. Speas did not play in 2020 due to the cancellation of the Minor League Baseball season because of the COVID-19 pandemic. Speas split the 2021 season between the ACL Rangers and the with the Frisco RoughRiders of the Double-A Central, going a combined 2–3 with an 11.15 ERA over  innings.

Ricky Vanasco

Ricky Vanasco (born October 13, 1998) is an American professional baseball pitcher in the Texas Rangers organization.

Vanasco attended Williston High School in Williston, Florida. In his senior season, he posted a 6–2 record with a 0.53 ERA and 87 strikeouts in 53 innings. Vanasco committed to Stetson University. He was drafted by the Texas Rangers in the 15th round, with the 464th overall selection, of the 2017 MLB draft. He signed with the Rangers for a $200,000 signing bonus.

Vanasco made his professional debut in 2017 with the AZL Rangers of the Rookie-level Arizona League, going 0–1 with a 0.00 ERA and 16 strikeouts over 9 innings. His season was cut short when on August 31, he was struck in the head by a throw from his catcher Sam Huff. He suffered a concussion and missed the rest of the 2017 season. He returned to the AZL Rangers in 2018, going 3–3 with a 4.38 ERA and 25 strikeouts over   innings. He was shut down for the rest of the 2018 season on July 24 after developing elbow inflammation that required rehabilitation. Vanasco split the 2019 season between the Spokane Indians of the Class A Short Season Northwest League and the Hickory Crawdads of the Class A South Atlantic League, going a combined 3–1 with a 1.81 ERA and 75 strikeouts over   innings. He was named a 2019 Northwest League All-Star. Vanasco did not play in 2020 due to the cancellation of the Minor League Baseball season because of the COVID-19 pandemic. Vanasco underwent Tommy John Surgery in September 2020 after suffering an injury at the Rangers Alternate Training Site. Vanasco spent 2021 recovering from surgery, only returning to game action in the organizational fall instructional league. 
 
On November 19, 2021, Texas selected Vanasco to the 40–man roster. Vanasco split the 2022 season between Hickory and the Frisco RoughRiders of the Double-A Texas League, going a combined 3–5 with a 4.68 ERA and 118 strikeouts over  innings. He was optioned to Double-A Frisco to begin the 2023 season.

Avery Weems

Avery Brian Weems (born June 6, 1997) is an American professional baseball pitcher in the Texas Rangers organization.

Weems attended Coconino High School in Flagstaff, Arizona. Undrafted out of high school in 2015, he attended Yavapai College to play college baseball. He posted a 4–1 record with a 3.90 ERA with 61 strikeouts over  innings as a freshman in 2016. In 2017, he went 6–4 with a 2.89 ERA and 87 strikeouts over  innings. Following that season, he transferred to the University of Arizona to play for the Wildcats. Weems went 1–3 with a 5.69 ERA and 39 strikeouts over  innings in 2018. In his senior season of 2019, he went 4–5 with a 7.15 ERA and 47 strikeouts over  innings. Weems was drafted by the Chicago White Sox in the 6th round of the 2019 MLB draft and signed with them for a $10,000 signing bonus.

Weems split his professional debut season of 2019 between the Arizona League White Sox and the Great Falls Voyagers, going a combined 5–4 with a 2.09 ERA and 71 strikeouts over  innings. Weems did not play in 2020 due to the cancellation of the Minor League Baseball season because of the COVID-19 pandemic.

On December 8, 2020, Weems and Dane Dunning were traded to the Texas Rangers in exchange for Lance Lynn. During the 2020-2021 offseason, he played for the Atenienses de Manatí of the Puerto Rican Winter League, going 0–0 with a 1.54 ERA and 22 strikeouts over  innings. Weems spent the 2021 season with the Hickory Crawdads of the High-A East, going 4–6 with a 5.06 ERA and 124 strikeouts over  innings. He spent the 2022 season with the Frisco RoughRiders of the Double-A Texas League, going 2–6 with a 5.14 ERA and 107 strikeouts over 91 innings.

Weems received a non-roster invitation to major league spring training in 2023. On February 15, 2023, Weems underwent Tommy John surgery to repair a torn UCL, and missed the entire 2023 season.

Arizona Wildcats bio

Owen White

William Timothy Owen White (born August 9, 1999) is an American professional baseball pitcher in the Texas Rangers organization.

White attended Jesse C. Carson High School in China Grove, North Carolina. White was a three–sport athlete in high school, playing basketball through his senior year and quarterback on the football team through his junior season. White finished his senior season after posting a 10–1 record, 0.22 ERA, with 101 strikeouts in  innings. He was named the North Carolina Gatorade baseball Player of the Year for 2017–2018. White committed to the University of South Carolina to play college baseball for the South Carolina Gamecocks.

The Texas Rangers selected White in the 2nd round, with the 55th overall selection, of the 2018 Major League Baseball draft. He signed with Texas for a $1.5 million signing bonus.

After signing, White did not appear in an official game with a Rangers' affiliate in the 2018 season. Instead, he took part in a new program put in place by Texas for their newly drafted high school pitchers. The "de-load" program as the organization called it, emphasized building a foundation mentally and physically while resting the pitchers' bodies from a strenuous senior season and pre-draft showcase circuit. The players were put through a strength program and classroom work until the post-season fall instructional training started. White suffered a torn UCL and underwent Tommy John surgery in May 2019, causing him to miss the entire season. White did not play in 2020 due to the cancellation of the Minor League Baseball season because of the COVID-19 pandemic.

White spent the 2021 season with the Down East Wood Ducks of the Low-A East. In his first professional game, White struck the ground with his right hand after making a fielding error and fractured his hand. After making a rehab appearance with the ACL Rangers of the Rookie-level Arizona Complex League, he returned in August and finished the season posting a combined 4–1 record with a 3.06 ERA and 56 strikeouts over  innings. Following the 2021 season, White played for the Surprise Saguaros of the Arizona Fall League. White was named to the Fall League All-Star team. White was named the AFL Pitcher of Year, after posting a 5–0 record with a 1.91 ERA and 29 strikeouts over  innings.

White opened the 2022 season with the Hickory Crawdads of the High-A South Atlantic League. After going 6–2 with a 3.99 ERA and 81 strikeouts over  innings for Hickory, White was promoted to the Frisco RoughRiders of the Double-A Texas League in June. With Frisco he posted a 3–0 record with a 2.49 ERA and 23 strikeouts over  innings. White missed over two months with a right forearm strain, but returned in time to pitch in the Texas League playoffs. White was ranked as the 59th overall prospect in baseball by Baseball America, the 66th overall prospect by MLB Pipeline, and the 70th overall prospect by The Athletic's Keith Law during the 2023 off-season. On November 15, 2022, White was selected to the Rangers’ 40-man roster.

White suffered neck inflammation in spring training and was optioned to the Double-A Frisco RoughRiders to begin the 2023 season.

Rosters

Triple-A

Double-A

High-A

Single-A

Rookie

Foreign Rookie

Minor League Coordinators
The Rangers' Minor League Coordination staff consists of:
Field/Infield: Kenny Holmberg
Pitching: Jordan Tiegs
Pitch Design Specialist: Brendan Sagara
Director, Hitting: Cody Atkinson
Catching: Garrett Kennedy
Full Season Hitting Coordinator: Eric Dorton

References

minor league players
Lists of minor league baseball players